is a Japanese politician of the Constitutional Democratic Party of Japan and a member of the House of Councillors in the Diet (national legislature). A native of Myōkō, Niigata and graduate of Keio University, he had served in the assembly of Niigata Prefecture between 1999 and 2003. He was elected to the House of Councillors for the first time in 2007.

References

External links 
  in Japanese.

Members of the House of Councillors (Japan)
Keio University alumni
Living people
1966 births
Constitutional Democratic Party of Japan politicians
Democratic Party of Japan politicians